The International Cocoa Organization (ICCO) is a global organization, composed of both cocoa producing and cocoa consuming countries with a membership. Located in London, ICCO was established in 1973 to put into effect the first International Cocoa Agreement which was negotiated in Geneva at a United Nations International Cocoa Conference. There have since been seven Agreements. The Seventh International Cocoa Agreement was negotiated in Geneva in 2010 and came into force provisionally on 1 October 2012.

On 2 November 2005, the total percentage of exporting countries which had acceded to the Agreement surpassed 80%. Thus, the International Cocoa Agreement, 2001 entered into force definitively for the first time in the 30-year history of the International Cocoa Agreements. ICCO Member countries represent almost 85% of world cocoa production and more than 60% of world cocoa consumption. All Members are represented in the International Cocoa Council, the highest governing body of the ICCO.

The two most important breakthroughs of the present International Cocoa Agreement were the establishment of an explicit mandate on a Sustainable World Cocoa Economy and the founding of the Consultative Board on the World Cocoa Economy.

The Consultative Board consists of fourteen international experts in the cocoa sector, all from the private sector (seven from cocoa producing Member countries and seven from cocoa consuming Member countries). However, the Board, whose mandate is as extensive as that of the International Cocoa Council and comprises all aspects of the world cocoa economy, only functions in an advisory capacity, as all final decisions are taken by the International Cocoa Council. The Consultative Board was established in recognition of the importance of the private sector in the world cocoa economy and of the increasingly important role that trade and industry have been playing in ICCO.

References

Cocoa production
Cocoa
Intergovernmental organizations established by treaty
International organisations based in London
Organizations based in Abidjan
Organizations established in 1973